Human Problem Solving (1972) is a book by Allen Newell and Herbert A. Simon.

See also
problem solving

References

1972 non-fiction books
Artificial intelligence
Collaborative non-fiction books
Prentice Hall books